In chemistry, a fluoroanion or fluorometallate anion is a polyatomic anion that contains one or more fluorine atoms. The ions and salts form from them are also known as complex fluorides. They can occur in salts, or in solution, but seldom as pure acids. Fluoroanions often contain elements in higher oxidation states. They mostly can be considered as fluorometallates, which are a subclass of halometallates.

The following is a list of fluoroanions in atomic number order.
trifluoroberyllate
tetrafluoroberyllate
tetrafluoroborate
magnesium tetrafluoride
tetrafluoroaluminate
hexafluoroaluminate
hexafluorosilicate
hexafluorophosphate
Sulfur trifluoride anion
pentafluorosulfate aka pentafluorosulfite or Sulfur pentafluoride ion
sulfur pentafluoride anion
tetrafluorochlorate
hexafluorotitanate
hexafluorovanadate(III)
hexafluorovanadate(IV)
hexafluorovanadate(V)
trifluoromanganate 
hexafluoromanganate(III)
hexafluoromanganate(IV)
heptafluoromanganate IV
Tetrafluoroferrate 1− and 2−
hexafluoroferrate 4− and 3−
tetrafluorocobaltate II
Hexafluorocobaltate III and IV
Heptafluorocobaltate IV
Tetrafluoronickelate
Hexafluoronickelate II, III and IV
hexafluorocuprate
tetrafluorozincate
Hexafluorogallate
hexafluorogermanate
hexafluoroarsenate
tetrafluorobromate
hexafluorobromate
pentafluorozirconate 
hexafluorozirconate
octafluorozirconate 
hexafluoroniobate
heptafluoroniobate
octafluoromolybdate 
tetrafluoropalladate
hexafluororhodate
hexafluororuthenate(IV)
hexafluororuthenate(V)
hexafluoroindate
hexafluorostannate
fluoroantimonate
hexafluoroiodate 1−
octafluoroxenate
tetrafluorolanthanate 
pentafluorocerate IV
Hexafluorocerate IV
Heptafluorocerate IV
octafluorocerate IV
pentafluorohafnate
hexafluorohafnate
heptafluorotantalate 
octafluorotantalate
heptafluorotungstate
octafluorotungstate  
octafluororhenate
hexafluoroplatinate
tetrafluoroaurate 
hexafluoroaurate 
hexafluorothallate(III)
tetrafluorobismuthate

References

Fluorine compounds
Anions
Double salts